Sellia  may refer to:

Sellia, Chania, a village in the municipality of Vamos, Chania, Greece
Sellia, Rethymno, a village in the municipality of Foinikas, Rethymno, Greece
Sellia, Calabria, a comune in the Province of Catanzaro, Italy
Sellia (snail), a genus in family Hydrobiidae

See also
Sellia Marina, a comune in the Province of Catanzaro, Calabria, Italy